Belén López Morales (born 18 April 1984 in Rota, Andalusia) is a Spanish cyclist, who currently rides for UCI Women's Continental Team .

Major results

2007
 1st Gran Premio San Isidro
2008
 3rd Gran Premio San Isidro
 3rd Trofeo Xerox Ega
2009
 1st Premio Ayuntamiento Sopelana
 1st Trofeo Diputación de Málaga
 1st Gran Premio Ayuntamiento de Elorrio
 2nd Road race, National Road Championships
2010
 1st Iurreta Criterium
 3rd Gran Premio San Isidro
2011
 1st Gran Premio San Isidro
 2nd Trofeo Gobierno de La Rioja
 3rd Time trial, National Road Championships
2012
 3rd Zalla Criterium
 3rd Time trial, National Road Championships
2013
 1st Gran Premio Txori-Erri
 1st Clasica de la Montaña Palentina
 1st Villabona-Zizurkil
 1st Tolosa Criterium
 2nd Bergara-Osintxu
 2nd Trofeo Gobierno de La Rioja
 3rd Time trial, National Road Championships
 3rd Balmaseda Criterium
 5th Overall Vuelta Internacional Femenina a Costa Rica
 7th Overall Tour Féminin en Limousin
 10th Overall Tour Languedoc Roussillon
2014
 2nd Time trial, National Road Championships
2015
 1st  Overall Vuelta a Burgos Feminas
1st Stage 1 (ITT)
2017
 1st Time trial, Andalusian Road Championships
2018
 1st Time trial, Andalusian Road Championships
 5th ReVolta
 8th Overall Vuelta a Burgos Feminas

References

External links
 

1984 births
Living people
Spanish female cyclists
People from Rota, Andalusia
Sportspeople from the Province of Cádiz
Cyclists from Andalusia